Salt River Secondary School is a school in the Western Cape

References

Schools in the Western Cape